(Conflict Room) is a series of public panel discussions held at the Schaubühne in Berlin since January 2000. Each season focuses on a different theme from the areas of politics and society. In moderated discussions held every four to six weeks before an audience of international guests, invited experts discuss topics from the areas of politics, culture, technology, media, and the human and natural sciences. The series has been organised and moderated by Carolin Emcke since 2004. Emcke states at the opening of each event that Streitraum is not a forum for arguments and conflict but rather an opportunity to watch people think. Each session ends with questions from the audience.

Jason Farago of BBC Culture has regarded Streitraum as "an intelligent and aggressive public lecture series".

A season as an example 
In the second event, Alain Badiou and Thomas Ostermeier discussed the legitimacy and authority of democracy from the perspective of philosophy and theatre.

Two discussions were dedicated to the conflict in Russia and the Ukraine. The title  (When I think of Russia ..., after Heine's ) was given to the discussions between Emcke and her guestswho included Alice Bota, Nino Haratischwili and Katja Petrowskajaabout the relevance of fiction to an evaluation of the actual political situation in these regions. Another discussion, ?

The next event was related to a play performed at the Schaubühne, Milo Rau's The Civil Wars, which was in 2015 part of the Festival Internationale Neue Dramatik (F.I.N.D.).

Streitraum Extra 
Occasionally, events unrelated to the season's theme are held under the name of Streitraum Extra.

The December 2015 Streitraum Extra was dedicated to refugees with a reading of pertinent texts, with Lars Eidinger, Nina Hoss, Eva Meckbach, Terézia Mora, Thomas Ostermeier, Katja Petrowskaja, Najem Wali, Liao Yiwu, and Carolin Emcke participating. It was held as a charity event for Pro Asyl.

References

External links 
 Streitraum Schaubühne am Lehniner Platz
 streitraum's Videos Vimeo

Political events
Events in Berlin
Education in Berlin
Politics of Germany
2000 establishments in Germany